State Route 80 (SR 80) is a north-south state highway in Middle Tennessee. The -long road traverses portions of Smith and Macon Counties.

Route description

SR 80 begins in Smith County just west Carthage at an intersection with SR 25 on the banks of the Cumberland River. It then goes north as a 2-lane country road, having an intersection with SR 85, about 2 miles west of Defeated, just after passing through Monoville. It the passes through some rolling hills and farmland before passing through Pleasant Shade. It then crosses into Macon County shortly afterwards. It then winds through some more hills before having an intersection with Defeated Creek Road, a back road to Defeated. SR 80 then ends at a 4-way stop intersection with SR 56 and SR 262 in Willette.

Major intersections

See also

References 

080
080
080